Risdon is a surname and also a first name, and may refer to:

 Given name
 Risdon Beazley (1904–1979), British businessman

 Surname
 Dustin Risdon (born 1981), Canadian professional golfer
 Elisabeth Risdon (1887–1958) English film actress
 Josh Risdon (born 1992), Australian footballer
 Tristram Risdon (–1640), English antiquarian, topographer, and author
 Wilfred Risdon (1896–1967), British political organiser and antivivisection campaigner

See also
 James Risdon Bennett (1809–1891), English physician